RVP may refer to:

People
 Robin van Persie (born 1983), Dutch footballer
 Ryan Van Poederooyen (born 1983), Canadian drummer

Political parties
 Rehoboth Volksparty, Namibia
 Rechtse Volkspartij, Netherlands
 Ruotsalainen vapaamielinen puolue, Liberal Swedish Party
 Rahvuslik Vabameelne Partei, National Liberal Party (Estonia)

Other
Revolution Populi cryptocurrency 
 RVP (film), Fujichrome Velviacolor reversal films
 Reid vapor pressure
 Royal Victoria Place, a shopping centre in Tunbridge Wells, England
 Royal Variety Performance, an annual televised variety show in the United Kingdom